Steve Hardy (born 6 October 1957) is a Canadian former swimmer. He competed in two events at the 1976 Summer Olympics.

References

External links
 

1957 births
Living people
Canadian male swimmers
Olympic swimmers of Canada
Swimmers at the 1976 Summer Olympics
Sportspeople from British Columbia
Pan American Games medalists in swimming
Pan American Games silver medalists for Canada
Swimmers at the 1975 Pan American Games
Medalists at the 1975 Pan American Games